Pop'n Music Mickey Tunes is a musical video game published by Konami for several platforms in 2000. The game is a Mickey Mouse and Disney-themed installment of Konami's Pop'n Music franchise. While the game was originally released for arcades in 2000, it was later ported to the PlayStation (as Pop'n Music Disney Tunes) and the Game Boy Color (as Pop'n Music GB Disney Tunes) in November 2000. All versions of the game were only released in Japan.

Gameplay 
Pop'n Music Disney Tunes plays the same as other titles in the Pop'n Music series. Using a speciality controller, the player must tap in time with the music notes on the bottom of the screen to play along.

Similar to other Bemani titles, a meter below showcases how well the player is doing. Having a high-enough meter allows the player to pass the song and move onto the next one, while depleting it fully will fail the song and the player must start over.

The Game Boy Color version runs on the same game engine as Pop'n Music GB. This version is controlled using the Game Boy Color itself, which due to its lack of buttons or dedicated controller, only uses a 5-button control scheme.

Music 
The game contains 14 songs, which except for D.D.D.!, are all Japanese covers of existing Disney songs (mostly in relation to Mickey Mouse and Friends). The songs are split into three stages (four songs in each) which function as difficulties. Mickey Mouse and Friends characters are showcased as the dancers, which vary on the song.

The Game Boy Color version uses 8-bit versions of the songs.

First Stage 

 The Alfee feat. Donald Duck - "D.D.D!" (Daisy Duck and Donald Duck)
 James Grager - "Turkey in the Straw" (Donald Duck and Grandma Duck)
 Tapir - "It's a Small World" (Goofy and Scrooge McDuck)
 Noriko Fukushima & SAKI - "Dance With Mickey" (Minnie Mouse and Daisy Duck)

Second Stage 

 BAKU BAND - "Mickey Mouse March" (Goofy and Donald Duck)
 SAKI - "Totally Minnie" (Minnie Mouse and Pluto)
 Lala Moore & SAKI - "Mickey Mania" (Daisy Duck, Chip, and Dale)
 Naomi Tamura - "Zip-a-Dee-Doo-Dah" (Donald Duck and Goofy)

Third Stage 

 Lala Moore - "Welcome to Rio" (Pluto and Daisy Duck)
 SUZY CREAM CHEESE - "Baroque Hoedown" (Daisy Duck, Huey, Dewey, and Louie)
 REDDY yoko & SAKI - "Crazy 'Bout The Mouse" (Mickey Mouse and Donald Duck)
 Lala Moore - "Mousetrap" (Mickey Mouse, Morty, and Ferdie)

Hidden Songs 
These two songs do not appear in normal gameplay, and can only be accessed in the Third Stage if the player completes the first two stages without any "Bad" scores.

 CHELSEA & WORNELL - "Ice Ice Mickey" (Mickey Mouse and Minnie Mouse)
 CHELSEA - "The Greatest Band" (Mickey Mouse and Minnie Mouse)

References

2000 video games
Arcade video games
Dance video games
Disney video games
Game Boy Color games
Japan-exclusive video games
Konami arcade games
Konami games
PlayStation (console) games
Video games developed in Japan